Opostega atypa is a moth of the family Opostegidae. It was described by Turner in 1923. It is known from Queensland in Australia.

Adults have been recorded in July.

References

Opostegidae
Moths described in 1923